Neil D. Hamilton is an American lawyer and agricultural economics writer. Hamilton currently holds the Dwight D. Opperman Chair of Law at Drake Law School in Des Moines, Iowa, where he is also the Director of the Agricultural Law Center.  He is a former chairman of the Agriculture Law Section of the Association of American Law Schools.  He was also mentioned as a possible Secretary of Agriculture in the Obama Administration.

Before coming to Drake Law School in 1983, he taught at the University of Arkansas. He was an Assistant Attorney General in the office of the Iowa Attorney General from 1979 to 1981.

Hamilton is a past president of the American Agricultural Law Association (AALA).  He has authored books and articles on agricultural and environmental law.  Hamilton wrote "The Food Chain", a column in the Des Moines Register.

Education
 B.S., Forestry and Economics, Iowa State University, 1976.
 J.D., University of Iowa, 1979.

Bibliography

A Farmer’s Guide to Production Contracts (1995)
What Farmers Need to Know About Environmental Law
"How Industrialization is Restructuring Food Production", Leopold Letter (vol. 6, nos. 1,2)

References

External links
Drake Law School profile

American legal writers
American legal scholars
Iowa lawyers
Iowa State University alumni
University of Iowa College of Law alumni
Year of birth missing (living people)
Living people
University of Arkansas faculty
Drake University faculty
Agricultural law scholars